Robert Charles Humphery (born August 23, 1961 in Lubbock, Texas)  is a former professional American football player who played cornerback for seven seasons in the NFL. He also played in the WLAF and CFL.

References 

1961 births
Living people
People from Lubbock, Texas
American football defensive backs
American football return specialists
Green Bay Packers players
New Mexico State Aggies football players
New York Jets players
Los Angeles Rams players
San Antonio Riders players
San Antonio Texans players